The 2012 Formula Pilota China season was the second season of the Formula Pilota China series and the last to run on regulations based upon Formula Abarth. The championship started on 17 June at Shanghai and finished on 8 December at Sepang after eighteen races held at six meetings.

Teams and drivers
 All cars were FPT-engined Tatuus FA010 chassis.

Race calendar and results
The series' provisional schedule was released on 3 March 2012. It will consist of six rounds, with three races at each round. The Guangdong and Shanghai Tianma events were dropped, while Zhuhai and the new Penbay International Circuit in Taiwan were included. But later calendar was revised with changing Zhuhai and Penbay to Guandong and second Sepang round.

Standings

Drivers' championship
 Points for both championships were awarded as follows:

Best Asian Driver Trophy

Teams' championship

References

External links

Formula Masters China seasons
Formula Pilota China season
Formula Pilota China season
Pilota China